Devoll is a municipality in Korçë County, southeastern Albania. The municipality consists of the administrative units of Hoçisht, Miras, Progër and Qendër Bilisht with Bilisht constituting its seat. As of the Institute of Statistics estimate from the 2011 census, there were 26.716 in Devoll Municipality. It derives its name from the Devoll River flowing through the valley. The border point Kapshticë/Krystallopigi connects Devoll with the Greek regional units of Florina and Kastoria to the east and southeast. Devoll borders the municipalities of Kolonjë to the southwest, Korçë to the west, Maliq to the northwest and Pustec to the north. The area of the municipality is 453.27 km2.

History

Excavations at Tren cave unearthed Mycenaean Greek pottery of the Late Bronze Age. This appears to be of possible local manufacture.

The medieval era Devol fortress was the location where the Treaty of Devol between Bohemond I of Antioch and Byzantine Emperor Alexios I Komnenos was signed in 1108. Its site became forgotten in modern times, however it has been tentatively identified with the site Zvezdë (located at ), a conjecture already proposed by the 19th century British traveller William Martin Leake in 1835. Devol fortress was reconquered by the Bulgarian Empire in the beginning of the 13th century, but taken back by the Byzantines in 1259. The fortress continued to play an important role until the 14th century. Its site became forgotten in modern times.

In a text by Emperor John VI Kantakouzenos (r. 1347-1354) whose 'History' covers the years 1320-1356, there is mention of local Albanians;  “While the emperor was spending about eight days in Achrida (Ohrid), the Albanian nomads living in the region of Deabolis (Devoll) appeared before him, as well as those from Koloneia (Kolonja) and those from the vicinity of Ohrid.” This meeting was estimated to have taken place at around February 1328.

During the First World War, the Greek army burned several Muslim villages in the region, including Sinicë (Miras). In the events of 1914, one of those killed by the Greek troops was Bektashi Baba Hafiz of the tekke of Kuç. His bloodstained ritual cap was portrayed as a symbol in the tekke for many years after his death.

The chapel in the Blashtonjë cave on the edge of the Small Prespa Lake dates to the 13th century AD. The cave paintings are the oldest artworks which have been found in Albania and the icons in the chapel are among the oldest of their kind in the country.

It was in Devoll, while the region was within the Serbian Empire, that Emperor Stefan Dušan died in 1355.

In late Ottoman times and early Independence era, much of the Christian population emigrated abroad and then returned, and later a part of the Muslim population did the same.

Before the Second World War, the Devoll valley was an autonomous district. In the Communist period, it belonged to the Korçë region, which it was separated from in 1990 as part of the reform of administrative divisions. In the territorial reforms of 2015, the municipalities of Devoll region were transformed into the new municipality of Devoll, which was placed within Korçë County.

Today, there is again mass emigration, although this time the local Muslim population is emigrating in larger numbers and higher proportions than the Christian population, a reverse of the "Kurbet" of the previous century.

Geography 

Devoll is located in the southeast of Albania. The border settlement Kapshticë is not far from the easternmost point in Albania. The entire eastern and southern borders of the municipality are also the national border with Greece. On the western and northern sides, the municipality neighbours  Kolonjë, Korçë, Maliq and Pustec.

The municipality is located in the upper reaches of the Devoll river, which originates in the southwestern part of the area. Bilisht is located at around 900 m above sea level on a plain which is surrounded on all sides by mountains. The bordertown of Kapshticë is located at a height of 1048 m mountain pass. The western border is formed by the Malet e Moravës mountain range, whose highest mountain is the 1806 m high Maja e Lartë. The city of Korçë lies on the other side of this mountain range. There are only three passes through these mountains. In the northwest, the Devoll flows through a narrow canyon into the Plain of Korçë. In the northeast a long arm of the Small Prespa Lake stretches almost all the way to the Plain of Bilisht. In the southeast, the plain breaks off here and there almost imperceptibly into the Kore river valley, which cuts through the mountains here. This river, which is a tributary of the Haliacmon, makes a detour through Albanian territory of about 5 km. The few square kilometres of its drainage basin located in Albania are the only part of Albania which drains into the Aegean Sea rather than the Adriatic or Ionian Seas.

The Plain of Bilisht has been made fertile by means of numerous irrigation canals. As a result of heavy rainfall and spring snow melt, the water flows out of the Small Prespa Lake through a natural outlet, into the Devoll and then directly into the Adriatic. From the 1950s, until around 2000, the Devoll was redirected into the Small Prespa Lake during floods. The excess water was used to irrigate the Korçë Plain.

In the mountains east of Bilisht, along the Greek border, there are rich nickel deposits, concentrated in two main deposits, at Verniku and Kapshtica West.

Demography 

The population is overwhelmingly ethnically Albanian, with the majority of Albanians there having been Muslim at the end of the Ottoman era, while a minority of the Albanians, especially those that resided especially in high altitude areas, remained Orthodox Christian. The Albanian Christian population lives mostly in the upper valley of the Devoll river, in the town of Hoçisht, in Bilisht and in the village of Tren, and insist on being called only Albanian and not Greek.

Communities of Greeks and Aromanians are also found in the area, the former probably being more numerous. Additionally, a part of the original post-Ottoman Albanian Muslim population has converted to Orthodoxy as part of emigration to Greece.

There are also Roma present as well as Macedonians in the village of Vërnik. The Slavic-speakers of Vernik identify as Aegean Macedonians and refuse any Bulgarian or other identity. The Roma are mainly Muslim while the Macedonians are Orthodox Christians. In modern times, among the Albanian population, there has been extensive intermarriage between the Muslim and Christian populations, with the result being that many of the ethnically Albanian youth in the area identity with both traditions, as "half-Muslim, half-Christian". Like elsewhere in Albania, actual religious observance is typically lax although due to Ottoman history even among some non-practicers, religious identity may still plays a role in social relations, being more significant among the older generations.

The Albanian population speaks with a Tosk dialect, while the Macedonian population speaks the Kostur dialect. The entire Slavic-speaking Macedonian population is also bilingual in Albanian nowadays.

Economy

The border settlement of Kapshticë is among the most important routes from Albania into Greece. As a result, the whole region, which is isolated from the rest of Albania, is heavily dedicated to border trade with Greece. Despite being a primarily agricultural area a large service industry has developed around the border trade. In particular, many young men of this area worked in Greece in the 1990s, mostly illegally, in order to escape the poverty at home. Subsequently, it often happened that their families have joined them.

List of Mayors 

Mayors who have served since the Albanian Declaration of Independence of 1912:

References

Bibliography

External links 

bashkiadevoll.gov.al – Official Website 

 
Albanian ethnographic regions
Labëria
Municipalities in Korçë County